The University of Alberta Botanic Garden (formerly the Devonian Botanic Garden) is Alberta's largest botanical garden. It was established in 1959 by the University of Alberta.

History
The garden was created in 1959 and established on donated land.

The garden was originally designated the "Botanic Garden and Field Laboratory" of the department of botany at the U of A. In the 1970s, after the garden was severely damaged by floods, a donation from the Devonian Foundation, along with funds raised by the Friends of the Garden, helped to repair the damages, create a system of canals and ponds, construct a headquarters building, and purchase more land. In recognition of the donation, the name was changed to the Devonian Botanic Garden.

The Friends of the Devonian Botanic Garden was founded in 1971 as a fundraising group to support the aims and objectives of the garden.

In conjunction with an enhanced memorandum of understanding signed between the Aga Khan University and the University of Alberta in 2009, the University of Alberta requested the Aga Khan IV to develop an Islamic garden within the grounds. Planning the garden took nearly a decade and construction lasted 18 months. It was designed by the architectural firm Nelson Byrd Woltz Landscape Architects. The garden opened to the public in July 2018.

Throughout the 2018 season, gardeners completed the planting of over 25,000 new perennials, trees, shrubs, and wetland plants, and add finishing touches on landscaping. The total cost of the Aga Khan Garden was $25 million. The garden is tagged as the "most northerly Islamic garden in the world".

The botanical facility was renamed as the University of Alberta Botanic Garden in 2017. In September 2017, it invested $4.9 million to renovate its front entrance and parking lot.

Description

The gardens extend over 30 hectares (80 acres) of 12,000-year-old sand dune shoreline of pre-glacial Lake Edmonton, and include an additional 65 hA (160 acres) of natural areas.

It is linked to the North Saskatchewan River via the Parkland County trail and will soon be linked to a 74 km Edmonton Capital Region river valley recreation trail system.

Highlights of the garden include the Kurimoto Japanese Garden; a Tropical Showhouse with exotic butterflies; Temperate and Arid Showhouses; extensive alpine, herb, rose, peony, lilac, lily, and primula collections; Native Peoples Garden; trial beds, and much more. The Garden is open to visitors from May through Thanksgiving (Oct. 8), and year-round for adult and children's education programming.

It contains a diverse variety of plants, with emphasis on cold-hardy plants that can survive the harsh extremes of a Zone 3 climate.

As a unit of the Faculty of Agricultural, Life and Environmental Sciences, the garden is also a site for research, including plant conservation and diversity. A fully digitized herbarium contains a large collection of bryophyte specimens that is used for research and teaching, as well as horticultural plants grown at the garden.

Every June, the Edmonton Opera company plays music in the park for one day during an event dubbed  Opera al Fresco.

Awards
 2013: Alberta Emerald Award, for its outdoor environmental education programs
 2014: Botanical Garden of the Year, awarded by the Canadian Garden Council.

See also
List of botanical gardens in Canada

References

External links

 

1959 establishments in Alberta
Arboreta in Canada
Japanese gardens in Canada
Parks in Alberta
Parkland County
University of Alberta buildings
University and college buildings completed in 1959